Cressida Curzon Bonas (born 18 February 1989) is an English actress and model, known also for her relationship with Prince Harry between 2012 and 2014.

Early life and education
Bonas was born in Winchester, Hampshire, the only child of 1960s "It girl" Lady Mary-Gaye Georgiana Lorna Curzon (daughter of the 6th Earl Howe's second marriage) and her third husband, Old Harrovian entrepreneur Jeffrey Bonas. The Bonas family, once grocers and butchers, also owned textile mills in Castle Gresley and Burton-on-Trent; they constructed looms for their own use, and subsequently manufactured them for sale to other companies. The "Bonas Brothers" company closed operations in the 1980s, having produced, as its final line, elastic for women's tights.

She has seven half-siblings: three paternal half-brothers from her father's first marriage; one maternal half-sister from her mother's first marriage; and two maternal half-sisters and a maternal half-brother from her mother's second marriage, including actress Isabella Calthorpe.

Bonas studied ballet from the age of nine at the Royal Ballet School. Later, Bonas won a sports scholarship to Prior Park College in Bath, Somerset, then completed her formal education at Stowe School. She went on to study dance at the University of Leeds, graduating with a 2:1, before undertaking postgraduate dance studies at the Trinity Laban Conservatoire in Greenwich.

Career
Whilst at school, Bonas played cockney housekeeper Mrs. Swabb in Alan Bennett's Habeas Corpus, Miss Julie in the eponymous play, and Laura in Tennessee Williams's The Glass Menagerie.

She made her first screen appearance in 2009 with a small role in the TV series Trinity. Her theatrical debut came in 2014 at Hay Festival in the play There's a Monster in the Lake. The play was also staged at the Vault Festival in January 2015. In May and June 2015 Bonas appeared as Laura in the one-woman play, An Evening with Lucian Freud, by Laura-Jane Foley, at the Leicester Square Theatre, directed by Ella Marchment. Jane Shilling in The Daily Telegraph praised the "charm and energy of Bonas's performance". In June 2014 Bonas appeared in the film Tulip Fever (2015) as Mrs. Steen. In December 2016 and January 2017 Bonas played the female lead role of Daisy Buchanan in the musical play Gatsby, at the Leicester Square Theatre, based on F. Scott Fitzgerald's The Great Gatsby. In 2020 she played Sheila Caffell in White House Farm, a British television series about the 1985 White House Farm murders.

Bonas was photographed by Mario Testino for Vanity Fair after being included in the magazine's annual "International Best-Dressed List" in 2014. In January 2015, after modelling for British brand Burberry, Bonas was announced to front the 2015 campaign of fashion company Mulberry. Her work for the brand includes a two-minute-long advertisement released in March that co-stars actor Freddie Fox.

Personal life
Bonas has been called an "it girl". She was introduced to Prince Harry by Princess Eugenie in May 2012. On 30 April 2014, the couple was reported to have separated amicably. In May 2018, she was a guest at the wedding of Prince Harry and Meghan Markle.

On 25 July 2020, Bonas married property investor Harry Wentworth-Stanley in a small, private ceremony in West Sussex. The Wentworth-Stanleys are a Hertfordshire landed gentry family; his mother, Clare (née Steel), former social editor for Tatler magazine, is now wife of George Mountbatten, 4th Marquess of Milford Haven.

In July 2022 she confirmed her first pregnancy in The Spectator magazine. In November 2022, she was spotted pushing her newborn son, Wilbur James Wentworth-Stanley, in a pram. In a December 2022 interview, she revealed that she had  undergone In vitro fertilisation after struggling to conceive.

Selected credits

Theatre

Film and television

References

External links
 

1989 births
Living people
Actresses from Hampshire
Actors from Winchester
21st-century English actresses
English female models
English film actresses
English stage actresses
English television actresses
People educated at Stowe School
Alumni of the University of Leeds